Social partners are groups that cooperate in working relationships to achieve a mutually agreed-upon goal, typically for the benefit of all involved groups. Examples of social partners include employers, employees, trade unions, and governments.

Origin 
The concept of social partners arose in Europe in part from the disorder following the Industrial Revolution. Article 152 of the Treaty on the Functioning of the European Union (TFEU) states:

The Union recognizes and promotes the role of the social partners at its level, taking into account the diversity of national systems. It shall facilitate dialogue between the social partners, respecting their autonomy.

This article forms part of the Primary Law of the European Union (EU).

Role of social partners 
Social partners have a vital role to play in reaching out to workers and owners of enterprises and in particular those of SMEs and the informal economy, and in general, increasing the representation of their membership to ensure deeper and broader benefits of association, representation and leadership, including in the field of public policy advocacy, its formulation and implementation.

Process 
With the approaching of globalization, companies must bear more pressure from the competition between countries.

At the same time, new technology had replaced traditional industries causing structural unemployment.

The relationship between employee and employer becomes more complicated as the atypical employment turns into mainstream in the employment market. Because of these circumstances, the relationship between labor and employer has become more like partners. And this new idea of social partners had taken shape through the International Labor Organization (ILO1) and Europe social partnership system.

But there are quite few research and example about social partners in the US，the reason is that noun ”social partner” come up after WW2, that made European understand the importance of peace in every way, this new concept helped Europe rebuild the economy after the damage of war.

There is an inextricable connection between social partners and social dialogue, but what makes good social dialogue?
 Powerful and independent organization of labor and employer
 Both employee and employer have the willingness to talk equally
 Respect the freedom of association and the collective bargaining
 Appropriate institutional support

Influence 
The Treaty of Lisbon (Article 152 of the Treaty on the Functioning of the EU) recognises the role of the social partners in labour relations and European social dialogue. They represent their members during consultations with the Commission and the negotiation of collective agreements. They also sit with the European Economic and Social Committee, alongside other organisations representing civil society. The social partners play a key role in implementing the objectives of the Lisbon Strategy for Growth and Jobs, by launching projects and initiatives at European and national level.

European social partners have had a considerable influence on the preparation of the following Commission proposals:
 Revamping the rules to protect EU workers from harmful electromagnetic fields;
 The new framework Directive on the establishment of the European Works Councils;
 The Directive implementing the revised Framework Agreement on parental leave;
 The recommendation on a smoke-free environment

Examples in action

Poland 
The role of governments and social partners in keeping older workers in the labour market. In view of Poland’s ranking as lowest in the EU professional activity indicators for people aged 45+, the government and social partners see the need for actions boosting occupational development of this group. Poland has a universal plan called ‘Generations’ Solidarity: Actions for Increasing Occupational Activity of People Aged 50+’, developed within the social dialogue institutions. So far it has been implemented through legislation, most importantly with regard to the pension system, and specifically raising and equalising the statutory retirement age for men and women and restricting access to early retirement schemes. Very few actions revolve around improving the quality of work of older workers.

Korea  
Labor Foundation, which was founded in April 2007 under the tripartite consensus on the importance of social partners' autonomous contribution to a more stable and advanced labor relations, is the one and only public institution that is engaged in the programs and activities to promote the labor relations in Korea. The programs and activities of the Foundation, which are all designed to help and guide social partners to work together with responsibility and for their common benefits, include: financial assistance for social partnership education and joint programs; workplace innovation consulting to increase competitiveness at workplace; employment generation, by creating selective worktime jobs, improving the long work practice and promoting flexible work schemes; outplacement services for retirees in their 40s or older; counseling and education to prevent and remedy unreasonable discrimination in employment; and international exchanges in the field of labor relations.

References 
 http://www.eqavet.eu/qa/gns/glossary/s/social-partners.aspx
 http://www.eurofound.europa.eu/areas/industrialrelations/dictionary/definitions/europeansocialpartners.htm
 http://www.ilo.org/wcmsp5/groups/public/---europe/---ro-geneva/---ilo-brussels/documents/presentation/wcms_180714.pdf
 https://web.archive.org/web/20140606223116/http://www.tpwu.org.tw/periodical/391/1202.htm
 http://europa.eu/legislation_summaries/glossary/social_partners_en.htm
 http://www.ab.gov.tr/index.php?l=2
 http://www.ab.gov.tr/files/ardb/evt/1_avrupa_birligi/1_9_politikalar/1_9_7_sosyal_politika/consulting_european_social_partners.pdf
 http://www.eurofound.europa.eu/eiro/studies/tn1210012s/pl1210019q.htm
 http://inosa.or.kr/eng/front/KLF/whoweare.htm
 http://china.org.cn/world/Off_the_Wire/2014-04/22/content_32163654.htm

Labor relations